This is a list of episodes of Genie in the House.

Series overview

Episodes

Series 1 (2006–07)

Series 2 (2007–08)

Series 3 (2008–09)

Series 4 (2009–10)
This is part of season 3 but was split into two seasons for unknown reasons.

External links
 

Lists of British children's television series episodes
Lists of British sitcom episodes